Hawk Mountain is a mountain ridge, part of the Blue Mountain Ridge in the Appalachian Mountain chain, located in central-eastern Pennsylvania near Reading and Allentown. The area includes  of protected private and public land, including the  Hawk Mountain Sanctuary.

The River of Rocks is visible and accessible from the Sanctuary. The boulders were formed by periglacial processes in the Pleistocene epoch, or "ice age".

History
The mountain was previously called North Mountain because it is across the Lehigh Valley from South Mountain.
In 1929, the Pennsylvania Game Commission offered hunters $5 for every goshawk shot during migrating season, as the birds were considered pests. In 1932, Richard Pough (a birder and photographer from Philadelphia) photographed hundreds of killed hawks and published these photos in Bird Lore, the predecessor to Audubon. In 1934, after decades of hawk and eagle slaughter on the ridge, Rosalie Edge unilaterally ended the annual shoot by buying the property, changing the name of the mountain to the present one, and turning it into a sanctuary. Hawk Mountain Sanctuary was incorporated in 1938 and began year-round operations in 1946. The Game Commission bounty was terminated in 1951, although birds of prey continued to face threats, including from chemical pesticides like DDT. Bird counts have been taken at Hawk Mountain since the end of World War II, with the Sanctuary counting its millionth raptor on October 8, 1992.

Scouting and Civil Air Patrol
The mountain is also home to the Hawk Mountain Scout Reservation  and Hawk Mountain Camp  and the Civil Air Patrol's Colonel Phillip Neuweiler Ranger Training Facility (also known as the Hawk Mountain Ranger School).

Gallery

References

Ridges of Pennsylvania
Raptor migration sites
Landforms of Berks County, Pennsylvania
Landforms of Schuylkill County, Pennsylvania